The 1988–89 FIBA Women's European Champions Cup was the 31st edition of FIBA Europe's competition for national champions women's basketball clubs, running from September 1988 to 22 March 1989. The final featured clash between earlier 1987–88 season reigning champion Primigi Vicenza from Vicenza (Italy) and third place Jedinstvo Aida from Tuzla (then Yugoslav champion from Bosnia and Herzegovina). Jedinstvo Aida won a final game played in Florence for the first time in club's history, to become the second YU club to win the competition. Dynamo Novosibirsk and Astarac Mirande came third and fourth respectively.

Finals
Final game took place in Florence on 22 March 1989.

Road to finals
Schedule and Results – 1988–1989 European Cup for Women's Champion Clubs, per FIBA Europe website

Qualifying round

Round of 12

Round of 6

Group stage standings

Notes

References

Champions Cup
EuroLeague Women seasons